Perizoma actuata is a species of geometrid moth in the family Geometridae. It is found in North America.

The MONA or Hodges number for Perizoma actuata is 7319.

References

Further reading

 
 

Perizoma
Articles created by Qbugbot
Moths described in 1909